The 1954–55 Romanian Hockey League season was the 25th season of the Romanian Hockey League. Six teams participated in the league, and CCA Bucuresti won the championship.

Regular season

External links
hochei.net

Rom
Romanian Hockey League seasons
1954–55 in Romanian ice hockey